Liquefied gas (sometimes referred to as liquid gas) is a gas that has been turned into a liquid by cooling or compressing it.  Examples of liquefied gases include liquid air, liquefied natural gas, and liquefied petroleum gas.

Liquid air

At the Lister Institute of Preventive Medicine, liquid air has been brought into use as an agent in biological research. An inquiry into the intracellular constituents of the typhoid bacillus, initiated under the direction of Doctor Allan Macfadyen, necessitated the separation of the cell-plasma of the organism. The method at first adopted for the disintegration of the bacteria was to mix them with silver-sand and churn the whole up in a closed vessel in which a series of horizontal vanes revolved at a high speed. But certain disadvantages attached to this procedure, and accordingly some means was sought to do away with the sand and triturate the bacilli per se. This was found in liquid air, which, as had long before been shown at the Royal Institution, has the power of reducing materials like grass or the leaves of plants to such a state of brittleness that they can easily be powdered in a mortar. By its aid a complete trituration of the typhoid bacilli has been accomplished at the Jenner Institute, and the same process, already applied with success also to yeast cells and animal cells, is being extended in other directions.

When air is liquefied the oxygen and nitrogen are condensed simultaneously. However, owing to its greater volatility the latter boils off the more quickly of the two, so that the remaining liquid becomes gradually richer and richer in oxygen.

Liquefied natural gas

Liquefied natural gas is natural gas that has been liquefied for the purpose of storage or transport. Since transportation of natural gas requires a large network of pipeline that crosses through various terrains and oceans, a huge investment and long term planning are required. Before transport, natural gas is liquefied by pressurization. The liquefied gas is then transported through tankers with special airtight compartments. When the tanks are opened and the liquid exposed to atmospheric pressure, the liquid boils off from the latent heat of the air or its container.

References

See also
Liquid oxygen
Liquid nitrogen
Liquid hydrogen
Liquid helium

Laboratory techniques
Cryogenics